An inflationary gap, in economics, is the amount by which the actual gross domestic product (GDP) exceeds potential full-employment GDP.  It is one type of output gap, the other being a recessionary gap.

Overview 
The concept of the inflationary gap was first given by John Maynard Keynes in his work, How to Pay for War? (1940). In it, the concept was employed to study and solve problems regarding war finance. Keynes starts the analysis of the inflationary gap from the level of full employment equilibrium whereas his other analyses are based on under-employment equilibrium.

Mechanism 

Let the full employment output be YF and the actual output that the economy is currently producing be Y. If the difference YF - Y is negative, the actual national income exceeds the potential national income, which is known as the inflationary gap. If this gap is positive, it is known as recessionary gap.

The inflationary gap is always an ex-ante phenomenon; it is always expected to occur in the future. It arises when expected expenditure will not equal expected consumption at a future date.

Keynes defines it as the excess demand in the market for consumption of goods and services. He defined an inflationary gap as an excess of planned expenditure over the available output at pre-inflation or base prices. Given a constant average propensity to save, rising: money incomes at full employment level would lead to an excess of demand over supply and to a consequent inflationary gap. Thus Keynes used the concept of the inflationary gap to show the main determinants that cause an inflationary rise of prices.

When an initial increase in aggregate demand produces inflation (so called demand-pull inflation) and real GDP increase, the price level and real GDP are determined at the point where the new aggregate demand and the short-run aggregate supply meet. This point is known as above full-employment equilibrium, since the short-run aggregate supply is above the long-term aggregate supply, i.e. above the aggregate supply at full employment. The gap created between real GDP and potential GDP is the consequence of inflation, this is one of the reasons this type of gap is called an inflationary gap.

Obviously, this situation cannot last forever, because there is a shortage of labour. The shortage of labour produces the rise of wage rates, which makes the short-run aggregate supply decrease, until it reaches the full-employment level. The short-run aggregate supply decrease makes an upward pressure on the price level, consequently causing inflation. The once created gap between real GDP and potential GDP was the sign of forthcoming inflation, this is another reason this type gap is called an inflationary gap.

Causes, effects, and solutions

The main cause of the gap is considered to be expansionary monetary policies carried out by the government. An inflationary gap is a signal that the economy is in the boom part of the trade cycle: resources are being used over their capacity, factories are operating with increasing average costs, and wage rates increase because labour is used beyond normal hours at overtime pay rates. A case of the gap can arise when consumer or investor spending is very buoyant, when foreign demand is increasing or when government expenditure increases. According to some economists, such a situation arose in the United States in 1999-2000 and 2006-2007, when the unemployment rate was below 5%. Wages increase as a result of the increase in aggregate demand which in turn raises business costs. This leads to an increase in prices (inflation) and these higher prices reduce consumer purchasing power, causing aggregate demand to fall and the output gap to close. When the gap is finally eliminated, equilibrium is achieved, with actual GDP equal to potential GDP but at a higher price level. Some economists warn that this is not an automatic mechanism. Government action in the form of fiscal and monetary policies is a must to close the gap. Monetary policy can be used to contract the money supply in the economy by raising interest rates, which would reduce purchasing power, resulting in falling demand.  Keynes, however, was not in favour of monetary methods. He suggested a method of progressive taxation, where the collections from the taxes would be saved and used once equilibrium is achieved in the economy, which he called 'forced savings' Another method is to cut transfer payments and subsidies, thus cutting down consumption.

Criticism 
Milton Friedman criticized the Keynesian inflationary gap on the grounds that gap analysis can be used only under special circumstances like wartime. He stated that the analysis did not improve our knowledge of business cycles to a great extent. Bent Hansen criticized Keynes for limiting his analysis of the gap only to the goods market, leaving out the factor market. According to him, the gap is caused due to excess demand in both the goods and factor market. Another drawback of this model is its static nature, which was criticized by Milton Friedman, Erik Lundberg  and other economists. Keynes himself recognised this drawback and introduced time lags concerning receipts and expenditure of income. T. Koopmans introduced the idea of the speed of inflation, stating that the inflationary gap reduces as the speed of inflation falls. Another weakness of the theory is that it is concerned only with flow concepts like current income, expenditure, consumption, and saving. However the increase of prices affects not only current goods but also the stock of goods already out in the market. This point is ignored in the theory.

Despite these criticisms, the concept of inflationary gap has proved to be of much importance in explaining rising prices at full employment level and policy measures in controlling inflation.

See also 

 Recessionary gap
 Inflation

References

External links 
    psnacet.edu.in

Inflation